Lepuix is a commune in the Territoire de Belfort department in Bourgogne-Franche-Comté in northeastern France.

Geography

Climate
Lepuix has a humid continental climate (Köppen climate classification Dfb).

Gallery

See also

Communes of the Territoire de Belfort department

References

Communes of the Territoire de Belfort